Adani is a surname. Notable people with the surname include:

Abukar Umar Adani, Somalian businessman
Amos Adani (born 1946), Italian footballer
Daniele Adani (born 1974), Italian footballer
Dror Adani, Israeli criminal
Gautam Adani (born 1962), Indian businessman
Karan Adani (born 1987), CEO of Adani Ports & SEZ, son of Gautam Adani
Laura Adani (1913–1996), Italian actress
Mariella Adani (born 1934), Italian opera singer
Pranav Adani, Indian businessman, nephew of Gautam Adani
Priti Adani (born 1965), Indian philanthropist and chairwoman of Adani Foundation, wife of Gautam Adani
Ratubhai Adani, Indian politician
Usayd al-Adani (died 2017), senior leader of Al-Qaeda in the Arabian Peninsula

See also
 Adani (disambiguation)